This was the first edition of the tournament since 2011.

Andrey Kuznetsov won the tournament, defeating Daniel Muñoz de la Nava in the final.

Seeds

Draw

Finals

Top half

Bottom half

References
 Main Draw
 Qualifying Draw

Antonio Savoldi-Marco Co - Trofeo Dimmidisi - Singles
Antonio Savoldi–Marco Cò – Trofeo Dimmidisì